Hariharan is an Indian film director who has directed over 50 Malayalam films. His movies mainly revolve around the cultural and relational aspects of a typical Keralite society. His most notable works include  Sharapancharam (1979), Panchagni (1986), Idavazhiyile Poocha Mindappoocha (1979), Amrutham Gamaya (1987), Oru Vadakkan Veeragatha (1989), Sargam (1992), Parinayam (1994) and Pazhassi Raja (2009) which has won him wide critical acclaim. In 2019, he was awarded the J. C. Daniel Award, Kerala government's highest honour for contributions to Malayalam cinema.

Career 
Hariharan studied at St. Thomas College, Thrissur and Universal Arts College, Kozhikode. He entered the Malayalam film industry in 1965 working as an assistant director under film director M. Krishnan Nair. His first film Ladies Hostel was released in 1973, following which a lot of films with Prem Nazir and Madhu were released. Babumon was one of his box office hit movies of the black and white era. He directed two major films in Actor Jayan's career. His 1976 movie Panchami gave first major break to Jayan as an actor in malayalam cinema. In 1979 another movie Sarapanjaram was released with Jayan and Sheela. His films such as Valarthumrugangal, Panchagni, Nakhakshathangal, Oru Vadakkan Veeragatha, Sargam, Parinayam and Ennu Swantham Janakikutty have entered the Indian Panorama of International Film Festival. He has also been honored with a Diploma by the Pyongyang Film Festival of North Korea for Oru Vadakkan Veeragatha. In 1993, Sargam won him the Kerala State Award for Best Director and also National Film Award for Best Popular Film Providing Wholesome Entertainment. The film also received special honor at the Fukuoka and Swiss film festivals. His next film, Parinayam, won the National Film Award for Best Film on Other Social Issues and took part in about seven film festivals across the world. Ennu Swantham Janakikutty was the inaugural film at the Korean film festival (2000), and it also took part in the London film festival (2000).

Apart from these recognitions he has also won Filmfare and Ramu Kariat Awards for his works on multiple occasions. In 2009, he made Pazhassi Raja. It is based on the life of Kerala Varma Pazhassi Raja, the first revolter against the British East India Company. It was written by M. T. Vasudevan Nair. Later in 2011, he announced another historical film titled Randamoozham with Mohanlal in the lead role and written by M. T. Vasudevan Nair, which was an adaptation of his novel of the same name. It was to be produced by Gokulam Gopalan, but the project was later shelved.

Filmography 

{| class="wikitable"
|-  style="background:#ccc; text-align:center;"
! Year !! Title !! Script
|-
| 1973 || [[Ladies 
| 1974 || Bhoomidevi Pushpiniyayi || 
|-
| 1974 || College Girl || 
|-
| 1975 || Babumon || 
|-
| 1975 || Love Marriage || 
|-
| 1975 || Madhurappathinezhu || 
|-
| 1976 || Ammini Ammaavan || 
|
| 1976 || Panchami || 
|-
| 1976 || Rajayogam || P. Balakrishnan
|-
| 1976 || Themmadi Velappan || 
|-
| 1977 || Ivanente Priyaputhran || 
|-
| 1977 || Sangamam || 
|-
| 1977 || Sujatha || 
|-
| 1977 || Tholkan Enikku Manassilla || 
|-
| 1978 || Kudumbam Namukku Sreekovil || 
|-
| 1978 || Adimakkachavadam ||
|-
| 1978 || Snehathinte Mukhangal || 
|-
| 1978 || Yagaswam ||
|-
| 1979 || Idavazhiyile Poocha Mindappoocha||[[M. T. Vasudevan Nair
|-
| 1980 || Lava || S. L Puram
|-
| 1980 || Muthuchippikal ||
|-
| 1981 || Poocha Sanyasi || 
|-
| 1981 || Valarthumrugangal || M. T. Vasudevan Nair
|-
| 1981 || Sreeman Sreemathi ||
|-
| 1982 || Anuraagakkodathi ||
|-
| 1982 || Anguram ||
|-
| 1983 || Evideyo Oru Shathru || Unreleased
|-
| 1983 || Varanmaare Aavashyamundu ||
|-
| 1984 || Poomadathe Pennu ||
|-
| 1984 || Vellam ||
|-
| 1984 || Vikatakavi ||
|-
| 1986 || Panchagni ||M. T. Vasudevan Nair
|-
| 1986 || Nakhakshathangal ||M. T. Vasudevan Nair
|-
| 1986 || Anjaam || Remake of Sharapanjaram|-
| 1987 || Amrutham Gamaya ||M. T. Vasudevan Nair
|-
| 1987 || Mangai Oru Gangai (Tamil) ||
|-
| 1987 || Njanum Neeyum ||
|-
| 1988 || Aranyakam ||M. T. Vasudevan Nair
|-
| 1989 || Oru Vadakkan Veeragatha ||M. T. Vasudevan Nair
|-
| 1990|| Oliyambukal ||Dennis Joseph
|-
| 1992 || Sargam || Chovallur Krishnan Kutty
|-
| 1994 || Parinayam ||M. T. Vasudevan Nair
|-
| 1998 || Ennu Swantham Janakikutty ||M. T. Vasudevan Nair
|-
| 1999 || Prem Poojari ||P. Balakrishnan
|-
| 2005 || Mayookham ||Hariharan
|-
| 2009 || Kerala Varma Pazhassi Raja ||M. T. Vasudevan Nair
|-
| 2013 || Ezhamathe Varavu ||M. T. Vasudevan Nair
|}

 Awards 

National Film Awards:
 2009 - National Film Award for Best Feature Film in Malayalam - Kerala Varma Pazhassi Raja 1995 - National Film Award for Best Film on Other Social Issues - Parinayam 1993 - National Film Award for Best Popular Film Providing Wholesome Entertainment - SargamKerala State Film Awards:
 2009 - Kerala State Film Award for Best Director - Pazhassi Raja 1994 - Kerala State Film Award for Best Film - Parinayam 1992 - Kerala State Film Award for Best Director - Sargam 1989 - Kerala State Film Award for Best Film with Popular Appeal and Aesthetic Value - Oru Vadakkan Veeragadha 1979 - Kerala State Film Award for Best Film with Popular Appeal and Aesthetic Value - Idavazhiyile Poocha MindappoochaFilmfare Awards:
 2009 - Best Director - Pazhassi Raja 1994 - Best Director - Parinayam
 1986 - Best Director - Panchagni''
 2019 - Filmfare Award for Lifetime Achievement

Other awards
 2019 - J. C. Daniel award
 2012 - Prem Nazir Award
 1993 - V. Shantaram Award

References

External links 
 
 Official Website of Information and Public Relation Department of Kerala

Living people
Year of birth missing (living people)
J. C. Daniel Award winners
Kerala State Film Award winners
Filmfare Awards South winners
Directors who won the Best Popular Film Providing Wholesome Entertainment National Film Award
Directors who won the Best Film on Other Social Issues National Film Award
Malayali people
Film directors from Thrissur
21st-century Indian film directors
Artists from Kozhikode
Malayalam screenwriters
Screenwriters from Kerala
20th-century Indian film directors
Malayalam film directors